Buena Vista is the name of several localities in Puerto Rico:

 Buena Vista, Bayamón, Puerto Rico
 Buena Vista, Carolina, Puerto Rico
 Buena Vista, Hatillo, Puerto Rico
 Buena Vista, Humacao, Puerto Rico
 Buena Vista, Las Marías, Puerto Rico